
Restaurant De Graaf is a defunct restaurant in Amsterdam, in the Netherlands. It was a fine dining restaurant that was awarded one Michelin star in both 1990 and 1991.

Owner and head chef was Harry de Graaf.

The restaurant was closed down due to a subsiding kitchen. Renovation proved to be too costly, so closure was the only reasonable choice.

See also
List of Michelin starred restaurants in the Netherlands

References 

Restaurants in Amsterdam
Michelin Guide starred restaurants in the Netherlands
Defunct restaurants in the Netherlands